Jala may refer to:

Jala, Iran or Jalabi, a village in Hormozgan Province, Iran
Jala, Nayarit, a municipality in Mexico
Jala, either of two Palestinian settlements on the West Bank; see :Template:Hebron Governorate
Jala (kuih), a traditional snack in Malaysia and Brunei
Jala Brat (born 1986), Bosnian rapper

See also
Jalaa (disambiguation)